Teki Dervishi (16 January 1943 — 29 June 2011) was an Albanian poet, novelist, journalist and playwright.

Early life and career
Dervishi was born in Gjakova, in the region disputed between Yugoslavia and Axis-occupied Albania, now part of Kosovo.

After completing his primary education, he was imprisoned for several years at Goli otok, at the age of 17. Dervishi was one of the youngest Albanian prisoners at Goli otok. 
Dervishi finished secondary school in Peja and studied at the University of Pristina.

Besides Dervishi's literary activities, he also worked as a journalist. He worked for the Albanian-language newspaper Flaka e vëllazërimit (The Flame of Fraternity) in Skopje, and was later director and among the founders of the Albanian newspaper Bota sot.

Dervishi also worked as the director of the National Theatre of Kosovo in the 2000s.

Later life 
On 29 March 1999, at the outbreak of the NATO intervention in the Kosovo War, Dervishi was reported to have been assassinated. In July of that year, it was confirmed that he was alive.

Literary works 
Novels:
Pirgu i Lartë (The High Tower), 1972
Padrona, 1973
Skedarët (The Catalogues), 1974
Herezia e Dervish Mallutës (The Heresy of Dervish Malluta), 1981
Palimpsest për Dush Kusarin (Palimpsest For Dush Kusari), 1993

Verse:
Nimfa (The Nymph), 1970
Shtëpia e Sëmurë (The Sick House), 1978
Thashë (I Said), 1981

Theatre plays:
Pranvera e Librave (The Springtime of Books), 1990
Zhvarrimi i Pjetër Bogdanit (The Exhumation of Pjetër Bogdani), 1990
Kufiri me atdhe (The Border with the Fatherland), 1996
Vojceku (Wozzeck), 1996

Notes and references
Notes:

References:

  by Robert Elsie, The Guardian, Saturday Review, April 3, 1999, page 3.

1943 births
Kosovan poets
Albanian poets
Kosovan journalists
Albanian journalists
Kosovan dramatists and playwrights
Albanian dramatists and playwrights
Writers from Gjakova
2011 deaths